The Grammy Award for Best Traditional Gospel Album was awarded from 1991 to 2011.  A similar award, the Grammy Award for Best Soul Gospel Performance, Traditional was awarded from 1978 to 1983. It was previously known as the award Best Traditional Soul Gospel Album.

According to the category description guide for the 52nd Grammy Awards, the award is reserved for "albums containing at least 51% playing time of newly recorded traditional gospel vocal tracks" performed by "solo artists, duos, groups or choirs/choruses."

The category was discontinued from 2012 in a major overhaul of Grammy categories. From 2012, recordings in this category were shifted to the newly formed Best Gospel Album category.

Shirley Caesar and The Blind Boys of Alabama were the biggest recipients in this category with five wins each.

Recipients
Years reflect the year in which the Grammy Awards were presented, for works released in the previous year.

 Each year is linked to the article about the Grammy Awards held that year.

See also
 List of Grammy Award categories

References

General
 

Specific

External links
Official site of the Grammy Awards

Grammy Awards for gospel music
Album awards